Ángela Aguilar Álvarez Alcalá (born October 8, 2003) is a Mexican-American singer. She was born in Los Angeles while her mother was accompanying her father, Pepe Aguilar, on tour. Aguilar gained notable recognition after performing "La Llorona" at the 19th Annual Latin Grammy Awards in 2019. Her grandparents are the actors and singers from the Golden Age of Mexican cinema, Antonio Aguilar and Flor Silvestre.

Her debut solo studio album, Primero Soy Mexicana (2018), was met with critical acclaim and success. She has been nominated for a Grammy Award and two Latin Grammy Awards, becoming one of the youngest artists nominated for both awards.

Early life
Ángela Aguilar Álvarez Alcalá was born to Pepe Aguilar and Aneliz Álvarez Alcalá in Los Angeles, California on October 8, 2003, while her father was on tour. She was named after her great-grandmother Ángela Márquez Barraza Valle her father's paternal grandmother. Aguilar has dual citizenship with Mexico and the United States. Aguilar was born into a musical family, known as "La Dinastía Aguilar" (The Aguilar Dynasty). Aguilar's father is Mexican singer Pepe Aguilar, her paternal grandparents are Mexican singer-actors Antonio Aguilar and Flor Silvestre. Since a young age, Aguilar has frequently accompanied her father on tour throughout Latin America with her brother, Leonardo Aguilar.

In July 2018, Aguilar partnered with Voto Latino to encourage more Latino Americans to vote in American elections.

Career

2012-2017: Career beginnings 
In 2012, at just nine years old, Aguilar released Nueva Tradición, alongside her brother, Leonardo. It featured four songs by Leonardo and four by Ángela. In 2016, Aguilar participated in the BBC 100 Woman festival in Mexico City. At just 13 years old, she was the youngest performer, she told BBC News that the music industry was dominated by men and hoped it would change.

In January 2018, Aguilar and her family launched an equestrian-musical style tour dubbed "Jaripeo Sin Fronteras". Aguilar accompanied her father, Pepe, her uncle Antonio, and her brother, Leonardo Aguilar.

2018-present: Primero Soy Mexicana and Mexicana Enamorada 
On March 2, 2018, Aguilar released her first solo album, Primero Soy Mexicana, produced by her father, Pepe. The album featured eleven well known ranchera songs previously performed by other prominent music artists such as, Lucha Villa, Rocio Durcal, and her grandmother, Flor Silvestre. Aguilar performed the album's first single, "Tu Sangre en Mi Cuerpo" at the 2018 Premios Tu Mundo. On September 20, 2018, Aguilar was nominated for Best New Artist and her album, Primero Soy Mexicana was nominated for Best Ranchero/Mariachi Album at the 19th Annual Latin Grammy Awards. At the ceremony, she performed "La Llorona", where she received a standing ovation from the audience. Aguilar received widespread praise from various artists, including Mexican ranchera singer Vicente Fernández for her performance. On December 7, 2018, Aguilar's album Primero Soy Mexicana, was nominated for a Grammy Award for Best Regional Mexican Music Album.

On April 3, 2019, Aguilar was named the Artistic and Cultural Ambassador of Zacatecas, Mexico by Mayor Ulises Mejía Haro. On May 21, 2019, Aguilar was nominated for three awards at the 2019 Premios Juventud. She performed a medley of songs alongside mariachi singers Christian Nodal and Pipe Bueno. On July 23, 2019, Aguilar released an exclusive cover performance of "Shallow" on the Recording Academy's YouTube page, with permission from the songwriter, Lady Gaga. It is the first time that Aguilar has recorded in English.

On January 31, 2020, Aguilar released a tribute album to American singer, Selena, titled Baila Esta Cumbia. On September 24, 2021, she released her third album, Mexicana enamorada.  On April 1, 2021 she releases "En realidad", the first single from her third studio album.

Personal life 
Aguilar was born into a musical family, known as "La Dinastía Aguilar" (The Aguilar Dynasty). Aguilar's father is Mexican singer Pepe Aguilar, her paternal grandparents are Mexican singer-actors Antonio Aguilar and Flor Silvestre, her brother is Leonardo Aguilar.

Discography
Nueva Tradición (2012)
Primero Soy Mexicana (2018)
Mexicana Enamorada (2021)

EPs 
Baila Esta Cumbia (2020)
Que no se apague la música (2020)

Guest Works 
Nueva tradición (Family Disc) (2012)
MTV Unplugged (Pepe Aguilar) (2014)

Awards and nominations

Notes

References

2003 births
Living people
American women singer-songwriters
Singers from Los Angeles
21st-century American women singers
21st-century American singers
Mariachi musicians
Ranchera singers
American child musicians
American musicians of Mexican descent
Spanish-language singers of the United States
Hispanic and Latino American women singers
Women in Latin music
Singer-songwriters from California
Hispanic and Latino American musicians